Leptolaena raymondii is a species of flowering plant in the Sarcolaenaceae family. It is found only in Madagascar. Its natural habitat is sandy shores. It is threatened by habitat loss.

References

raymondii
Endemic flora of Madagascar
Taxonomy articles created by Polbot

Endangered flora of Africa
Flora of the Madagascar lowland forests